Francisco "Francis" Jesús Ferrón Ruiz (born 6 February 1990) is a Spanish footballer who plays for CD Badajoz as a forward.

Club career
Born in Algeciras, Francis made his senior debuts with AD Taraguilla. In July 2010 he joined UD Los Barrios in Tercera División but left the club in October due to personal reasons, and returned to his previous club shortly after.

On 4 June 2011 Francis joined Algeciras CF, also in the fourth level. After scoring 15 goals for the Andalusians, he moved to Recreativo de Huelva, initially assigned to the reserves in the same division.

On 16 March 2013 Francis played his first match as a professional, coming on as a second-half substitute in a 1–3 home loss against Girona FC. He appeared in four matches (one start, 108 minutes of action) with the main squad during the campaign.

In July 2013 Francis signed with UE Sant Andreu, in Segunda División B; in January of the following year he moved to league rivals La Hoya Lorca CF, scoring eight goals for the latter in the season. On 5 July 2014 he signed for CD Alcoyano, still in the third division.

In July 2015, Francis signed with Linares Deportivo for a year, but left the following January and returned to his former club Lorca. On 13 July 2016 he joined Real Balompédica Linense, still in the third division.

References

External links

1990 births
Living people
Footballers from Algeciras
Spanish footballers
Association football forwards
Segunda División players
Segunda División B players
Tercera División players
UD Los Barrios footballers
Algeciras CF footballers
Atlético Onubense players
Recreativo de Huelva players
UE Sant Andreu footballers
CD Alcoyano footballers
Linares Deportivo footballers
Lorca FC players
Real Balompédica Linense footballers
CD Badajoz players
Marbella FC players
San Fernando CD players